Tana is a genus of flies in the family Stratiomyidae.

Species
Tana paradoxa (Enderlein, 1913)
Tana paulseni (Philippi, 1865)

References

Stratiomyidae
Brachycera genera
Diptera of South America